Atmospheric optical phenomena include:
Afterglow
Airglow
Alexander's band, the dark region between the two bows of a double rainbow.
Alpenglow
Anthelion
Anticrepuscular rays
Aurora
Auroral light (northern and southern lights, aurora borealis and aurora australis)
Belt of Venus
Brocken Spectre
Circumhorizontal arc
Circumzenithal arc
Cloud iridescence
Crepuscular rays
Earth's shadow
Earthquake lights
Glories
Green flash
Halos, of Sun or Moon, including sun dogs
Haze
Heiligenschein or halo effect, partly caused by the opposition effect
Ice blink
Light pillar
Lightning
Mirages (including Fata Morgana)
Monochrome Rainbow
Moon dog
Moonbow
Nacreous cloud/Polar stratospheric cloud
Rainbow
Subsun
Sun dog
Tyndall effect
Upper-atmospheric lightning, including red sprites, Blue jets, and ELVES
Water sky

See also

References

Physics-related lists
Meteorology lists